Arctosa similis is a wolf spider species in the genus Arctosa found in Canary Islands, Morocco, Portugal to Croatia.

See also 
 List of Lycosidae species

References

External links 

similis
Spiders of Europe
Spiders of the Canary Islands
Spiders of Africa
Fauna of Morocco
Spiders described in 1938